Tuppers Plains is a census-designated place on the boundary of the Olive and Orange townships of Meigs County, Ohio, United States. It includes the small town of Tuppers Plains for which it is named.

Education
Public education in the community of Tuppers Plains is provided by the Eastern Local School District. Campuses serving the community include Eastern Elementary School (Grades K-8) and Eastern High School  (Grades 9-12).

References

Unincorporated communities in Ohio
Unincorporated communities in Meigs County, Ohio
Census-designated places in Ohio